Dara Reneé (born November 7, 2000) is an American actress whose roles include Kourtney Greene in the Disney+ mockumentary series High School Musical: The Musical: The Series.

Early life
Reneé was born in Los Angeles, California, and raised in Baltimore where her mother, Kimberly Brooks, founded a non-profit performing arts school, Encouraging Youth To Dream, in Pikesville. Brooks is a voice actress, and Reneé's grandmother was a member of 1960s Baltimore soul group The Royalettes. Reneé attended John Paul Regional Catholic School in Milford Mill. She initially tried auditioning for theater roles in New York before moving back to California to finish high school at Charter High School of the Arts (CHAMPS) in Van Nuys.

Career
Reneé debuted with the role of Savannah in the 2018 Disney Channel Original Movie Freaky Friday.

In 2019, she had a recurring role as Stunts in the fifth season of the ABC Television series Black-ish. She also had a guest role in The Kids Are Alright.

Reneé stars in the Disney+ series High School Musical: The Musical: The Series as Kourtney, a student costume designer and Nini's best friend. The series premiered in November 2019. Reneé had auditioned for the roles of Ashlyn, Gina, and Kourtney; Kourtney was originally intended to be a one-off character, but Reneé was invited to become a series regular. She created the series' arrangement of "Bop to the Top". Starting in season 2 of the series, her own mother played her character Kourtney's mother, Michelle.

In 2021, it was announced that she would host Disney's Magic Bake-Off with Raven's Home star Issac Ryan Brown.

Filmography

References

External links
 

Living people
2000 births
21st-century American actresses
African-American actresses
American television actresses
Actresses from Baltimore
Actresses from California
21st-century African-American women
21st-century African-American people
20th-century African-American people
20th-century African-American women